The Thai FA Cup, known officially as The Football Association of Thailand Cup, is a football cup competition in Thailand. Thai FA Cup is an annual knockout association football competition in men's domestic football. It was held between 1974 and 1999 and relaunched in 2009. Raj Vithi won the first two editions.

In 2009 it was announced that the Thai FA Cup would return to the Thai football calendar. All the teams from the Thai League 1 and Division 1 League were automatically entered and teams from the Division 2 League as well as university and schools teams could apply to enter. The qualifying round took place from 27–30 June. The first round proper will see sixteen qualifiers progress to the second round where they will each meet a Division 1 side. The sixteen TPL teams enter at the third round stage. The final will be played at National Stadium with the winning team receiving 1,000,000 Thai baht. The runners-up will receive 500,000 Thai baht.

Competition format

Overview
The competition proceeds as a knockout tournament throughout, consisting of five rounds, a semi-final and then a final. There is no seeding, the fixtures in each round being determined by a random draw. Prior to the semi-finals, fixtures ending in a tie are extra time have been decided by penalty shoot-out. The first rounds are qualifiers, with the draws organised on a regional basis. The next rounds are the "proper" rounds where all clubs are in one draw.

Qualification for subsequent competitions

AFC Champions League
The Thai FA Cup winners qualify for the following season's AFC Champions League. The Thai FA Cup winners enter the AFC Champions League at the group stage.

Thailand Champions Cup
The Thai FA Cup winners also qualify for the following season's single-match Thailand Champions Cup, the traditional season opener played against the previous season's Thai League 1 champions (or the Thai League runners-up if the Thai FA Cup winners also won the league – the double).

Sponsorship

Championship history

Top-performing clubs 

1 as Buriram PEA 
2 shared title 
3 as Thai Port

See also
 Thai League Cup
 Thailand Champions Cup
 Thailand Football Records and Statistics

References

1. https://web.facebook.com/media/set/?vanity=ByTommyBar&set=a.187411361691646 เอฟ เอ คัพ (ไทยแลนด์) - ฟุตบอลไทยในอดีต By TommyBar

2. https://web.archive.org/web/20010516102358/http://www.thaisoccerteam.net/league2.html DIVISION 1 TEAM (1999) - thaisoccerteam.net

3. https://www.facebook.com/permalink.php?story_fbid=1378631452274119&id=564147727055833 ชมรมประวัติศาสตร์ฟุตบอลสิงห์ท่าเรือ

Thai FA Cup
Football in Thailand